is a passenger railway station located in the city of Kakogawa, Hyōgo Prefecture, Japan, operated by West Japan Railway Company (JR West).

Lines
Hioka Station is served by the Kakogawa Line and is 2.3 kilometers from the terminus of the line at

Station layout
The station consists of two unnumbered ground-level opposed side platforms, connected to the station building by a level crossing. The station is unattended.

Platforms

History
Hioka Station opened on April 1, 1913.

Passenger statistics
In fiscal 2019, the station was used by an average of 537 passengers daily

Surrounding area
 Hioka Shrine
 Kakogawa Prison
 Hyogo Prefectural Kakogawa Kita High School
 Kakogawa Municipal Hyooka Junior High School

See also
List of railway stations in Japan

References

External links

  

Railway stations in Hyōgo Prefecture
Railway stations in Japan opened in 1913
Kakogawa, Hyōgo